Oscar Obligacion (January 21, 1924 – February 2, 2010) was a Filipino comedian. He was known as Pantarorong and Kumang.

Early life
He was born on January 21, 1924, in Manila.

Personal life
He was married to his wife, Myrna Anderson Quizon, lived in the States with their children.

Filmography

Television shows

Movies

Death
Oscar Obligacion died on February 2, 2010

1924 births
2010 deaths
People from Quezon City
Filipino male comedians
Deaths from diabetes
Deaths from kidney disease